Halehsam (also Romanized as Haleh Sam and Halesam) is a village in Shabab Rural District, in the Shabab District of Chardavol County, Ilam Province, Iran. At the 2006 census, its population was 663, in 137 families.  The village was chosen to be the new capital city of Shabab Rural District after the village of Shabab, The previous capital was upgraded to a village and was chosen to become the capital city of Shabab District, established on June 30, 2013. The village is populated by Kurds.

References 

Populated places in Chardavol County
Kurdish settlements in Ilam Province